SS Leviathan was an ocean liner launched on 3 April 1913 and began service in 1914 as the transatlantic ocean liner Vaterland  for Germany's Hamburg America Line. The ship, second of three running mates and then the largest passenger ship in the World, made its first voyage to New York arriving on 21 May 1914 under the command of a Commodore and four Captains of the German Naval Reserve to celebrations featuring German and American officials at the line's Hoboken facilities.

The ship was designed to carry 4,050 passengers with most in third or fourth class. Those among the 700 first class and 600 second class passengers traveled in considerable luxury. The main public rooms took advantage of an unusual arrangement of the routing from boiler to stack along the sides rather than center to feature long and unbroken access from a replica of the New York Ritz-Carlton Restaurant main dining room forward to the lounge and ball room aft. Vaterland served on the route for less than a year before being laid up at the line's piers in the neutral United States due to the start of World War I and risk of seizure by the Allies at sea.

With U.S. entry into the war in 1917 Vaterland and the German line's Hoboken facility were seized by the US government. The ship was placed under the control of the United States Shipping Board and in July 1917 to the Navy for completion of repairs and conversion to a troop ship. In July 1917 the ship was commissioned as the USS Vaterland and on 6 September 1917 renamed Leviathan and assigned to the Cruiser and Transport Force. The ship's first troop transport voyage departed New York on 17 December 1917 with 7,250 troops. At Liverpool, England, the ship spent fifty days in drydock, where her size was shown to be a problem, and troop capacity was expanded to 8,200. Further trips were destined for Brest, France and troop capacity was incrementally increased to 10,500 by summer of 1918 and with double bunking to 14,000. The ship's speed allowed transit without escort and often Leviathan and the fast ships  and  made the transit in company without escort. During the war the ship made ten round trips transporting more than 119,000 troops to Europe. That process was reversed after the war with the ship's last voyage with returning troops arriving on 8 September 1919. The ship was decommissioned and turned over to the Shipping Board on 29 October 1919, remaining laid up at Hoboken until April 1922.

At the end of the war there was a surplus of ships and a large number of Shipping Board sponsored companies. Leviathan was not only competing against that surplus but from lack of information such as blueprints from Germany, so that new ones had to be created by actual measurement of the ship. The ship was also caught up in controversies regarding the company originally agreeing to operate the ship.
In April 1922, $8,000,000 in funding made it possible to move the ship to News Shipbuilding & Dry Dock Company, Newport News, Virginia, for a complete refurbishing and overhaul including all wiring and plumbing being replaced and conversion from coal to oil as fuel. Interior decorations, though much was kept, were modernized in a 1920s style.
In June 1923 the ship was returned to the Shipping Board with an increase in gross tonnage leading to advertisement as the largest and fastest liner, a claim that was challenged by both the British Cunard and the White Star lines. The United States Lines was contracted to operate the ship for a minimum of five Atlantic voyages per year. Though popular in the U.S. market, high cost and inability to sell alcohol during Prohibition, in which all U.S. registered ships were "dry", made it so that many sought foreign shipping. Even with the ship eventually being allowed to serve "medicinal" alcohol when outside U.S. waters the Great Depression drove the line to demand either subsidies or that the Shipping Board take the ship back. In June 1933 Leviathan was laid up at Hoboken. The Shipping Board required the ship to go into operation but losses were high. The 1936 high season for the Atlantic saw a loss of $143,000 on the first trip and by the required fifth voyage the ship was at half capacity. The line paid the Shipping Board $500,000 to retire the ship with a continued requirement to keep it in running condition. In the entire operating period as a U.S. liner the ship never made a profit.

British Metal Industries Ltd. bought Leviathan in 1937 with the ship arriving at Rosyth, Scotland, on 14 February for scrapping. The size of the vessel and start of World War II delayed final scrapping until 1946.

Construction and early career 
Construction began in September 1911.

Vaterland was built to conform to German, British and American laws and rules of shipbuilding. The ship had a double bottom and double skin to above the waterline with transverse and longitudinal steel bulkheads. The ship had five steel decks with four superimposed decks for a total of nine decks above the waterline. In an unusual, new, arrangement the funnels passed through the decks at the sides of the hull rather than center allowing an entirely new arrangement of the public rooms. Those rooms opened from one to the next so that a vista extended from the Ritz-Carlton restaurant, oval and replicating the New York original, through the palm garden, grand hallway to the main lounge and ball room. The main staircase extended through six decks and was supplemented by elevators. The wireless system, provided by Marconi rival, the Telefunken Company of Berlin, was the most powerful installed at the time on a ship, and consisted of a long distance set to keep the vessel in constant touch across the Atlantic, a second set with 400 mile day range and 1,200 mile night range and a battery powered set was on standby for emergencies. Of the 83 lifeboats, with a capacity for about 5,300, the two powered boats were also equipped with wireless. Forty-six watertube boilers in four stokeholds provided steam for the turbines driving the four 19' 7" diameter screws.

The ship was launched on 3 April 1913 in a ceremony performed by Rupprecht, Crown Prince of Bavaria. Intended passenger capacity of 4,050 was to be 700 first, 600 second, 1,050 third and 1,700 fourth class passengers. With 1,200 crew the total persons aboard was planned to be 5,250 with 83 lifeboats with capacity for more than those aboard.

On the ship's maiden voyage, arriving at New York on 21 May 1914, there were 1,234 crew commanded by a Commodore, four German Naval Reserve Captains and seven officers as watch officers. The engine department consisted of a chief engineer, three first engineers, thirty-five assistants and electricians with boilers operated by twelve chief firemen, fifteen oilers, 187 stokers and 189 trimmers. The ship was highly electrified and had an electric forced air system for fresh air throughout the ship.

At the reception luncheon held aboard at the Hamburg-American Line's Hoboken piers on that maiden voyage attended by the German Ambassador and officials of the line, Albert Gleaves, at the time Commandant of the New York Navy Yard and later Commander of the Cruiser and Transport Force in the war, asked an official how many troops the ship could carry. He reports the official replied: "Ten thousand, and we built her to bring them over here." Three years later, at the same pier, by then seized for the Army's Hoboken Port of Embarkation and with the ship under a new name, Gleaves again was aboard as commander of convoy operations in the Atlantic seeing the ship preparing to take 10,000 soldiers to fight Germany.
Vaterland had made only a few trips when, in late July 1914, she arrived at New York City just as World War I broke out. With a safe return to Germany rendered questionable by British dominance of the seas, she was laid up at her Hoboken, New Jersey terminal and remained immobile for nearly three years.

World War I 

Vaterland was seized by the United States Shipping Board when the United States entered World War I on 6 April 1917. Of all the German ships seized, Vaterland was the only one not to have engines and machinery damaged by the German crews. Her German crew was sent to a new internment camp in Hot Springs, North Carolina, where many of them later died of a typhoid fever outbreak in summer 1918 as they were about to be transferred to Fort Oglethorpe, Georgia. Despite the lack of intentional damage the ship was badly deteriorated requiring major repairs, cleaning and painting. The work was going slowly under the USSB with the Navy recommending that it take charge of that process and the ship was turned over to the custody of the United States Navy (USN) in June 1917. Leviathan was the last of the German ships turned over to the Navy to complete repair and conversion.

She was commissioned by the USN in July 1917 as the USS Vaterland, Captain Joseph Wallace Oman in command. On 6 September 1917 she was redesignated SP-1326 and renamed Leviathan by President Woodrow Wilson.

The trial cruise to Cuba on 17 November 1917 prompted Captain Oman to order 241 Marines on board to relieve a detachment of Marines and to station themselves conspicuously about the upper decks, giving the appearance from shore that the great ship was headed overseas to increase the American Expeditionary Forces. Upon her return later that month, she reported for duty with the Cruiser and Transport Force.

The transport sailed for Europe on 17 December 1917 with 7,250 troops to Liverpool, England where the transport's size, a major advantage with its troop capacity, demonstrated how highly that size limited the ports and repair facilities that could be used in Europe. The ship entered dry dock there but could only enter or leave the dry dock on full moon tides that were required to float the ship over the dock's sill. In the fifty days there the ship's troop capacity was increased to 8,200. The ship was repainted with the British-type dazzle camouflage scheme that she carried for the rest of the war. After return to New York her capacity was increased to 8,900. On 4 March 1918 the ship again sailed for Liverpool but diverted to Brest for future voyages due to poor berthing and coaling facilities in Liverpool. In early summer of 1918 the ship's troop capacity was increased to 10,500.

Leviathan began regular passages between the Hoboken Port of Embarkation and Brest, France, delivering up to 14,000 persons on each trip. Once experience in embarking troops was gained, 11,000 troops could board the ship in two hours. The fastest ships, to meet the troop transport demands in reaction to the German offensive of March 1918, began the system in which troops shared bunks taking turns to sleep. Leviathan thus doubled its capacity from 7,000 to 14,000 troops. With their speed Leviathan,  and  sailed without escort together. The German press was enthusiastic in the claim the former Vaterland converted to an American troop transport had been sunk.
On 29 September 1918 she left New York for Brest on a voyage that would prove to have the worst in-transit casualties of the deadly second wave of the Spanish flu. By the time she arrived at Brest on 8 October, 2,000 were sick, and 80 had died.

Transports, including Leviathan underwent a needed overhaul after signing of the armistice before the major effort of returning the troops began. After that date Leviathan, repainted grey overall by December 1918, reversed the flow of men as she transported the veterans back to the United States with nine westward crossings, the last ending on 8 September 1919. On 29 October 1919, Leviathan was decommissioned and turned over to the US Shipping Board and again laid up at Hoboken until plans for her future employment could be determined.

Before the armistice was signed on 11 November 1918, the ship made ten round trips from Hoboken to Europe transporting more than 119,000 fighting men. Amongst the ship's US Navy crew in this period was future film star Humphrey Bogart.

American service

Reconstruction 
The US Shipping Board was by the end of the war encumbered with surplus tonnage and government sponsored shipping companies. On 17 December 1919 the International Mercantile Marine (IMM) signed a contract with the United States Shipping Board's Emergency Fleet Corporation (EFC) that IMM as agent would supervise the plans and specifications for complete rehabilitation of the ship. That work was done by the construction department of IMM assisted by two committees of leading ship yard representatives, one to address general reconditioning and the other to address conversion from coal to oil as fuel. The result was issued on 9 April 1920 to six commercial and two Navy yards. Only one bid was returned by Todd Shipbuilding Corporation and the Boston Navy Yard responded with an estimate. Costs and work in yards were at a peak and the EFC decided to await a more favorable time to solicit new bids.

The EFC directed the agents in March 1921 to prepare a new set of specifications for a fully operational ship, including all necessary articles such as table and silverware, linens and books. The IMM construction department was thoroughly familiar with the ship including specifications for machinery repair which were not in the original request for bids. Blueprints for the original construction had not been received from Germany under the Versailles Treaty and the price now asked by the German builders, $1,000,000, was deemed outrageous so that an army of workers measured every part of the ship until a new set of prints had been made. On 31 October 1921 the new solicitation went out with bids due on 29 December 1921. The EFC postponed the bid opening to 30 December and accepted the bid of the Newport News Shipbuilding & Dry Dock Company in Newport News, Virginia, for $6,135,575 which was $3,334,000 less than the Boston Navy Yard's estimate and $5,145,000 less than the commercial bid received for the original despite that not including any work on machinery or incidentals such as table service and linens. On 15 February 1922 the contract was awarded to include $515,000 for machinery repair, for a total of $6,116,000 with a separate award to Gimbel Brothers of New York of $546,366.63 for the equipping the Steward's department with the incidental items. The total awarded was $6,656,366.63. At the same time Gibbs Brothers Inc., later named Gibbs & Cox, hired to oversee the work leading to the contract, were awarded $1,518,058.37 for agency fees, inspection, audits and accounting and miscellaneous repairs leading up to awarding the contract.

In agreement with IMM the EFC cancelled the agency contract and awarded it to Gibbs Brothers, who took over as agent and assumed on 28 February 1922 all functions and obligations previously assigned to IMM. Newspaper mogul William Randolph Hearst, riding on nationalistic sentiment, had objected to the IMM involvement by claiming British influence over IMM. Despite the prolonged lay-up at Hoboken, the ship was quickly prepared with repairs and provision of necessary gear, fueled and crewed to sail to Norfolk. The ship sailed on 9 April 1922 arriving without incident at the shipyard on 10 April. There the ship began a 14-month reconditioning and refurbishment. All wiring, plumbing, and interior layouts were stripped while her hull was strengthened and her boilers converted from coal to oil; virtually a new ship emerged.

While the ship was undergoing reconstruction, the Hoboken facilities were modified to be more suitable for such a large ship's operation. The plan changed and the ship was to be docked in Manhattan with an agreement with United American Lines to use Pier 86 at the foot of 46th Street. As a result of that decision the pier itself required strengthening and dredging was required to provide both a channel and turning basin.

The decorations and fittings, designed by New York architects Walker & Gillette, retained much of her prewar splendor of Edwardian, Georgian, and Louis XVI styles now merged with modern 1920s touches. The biggest deviation was an art deco night club supplanting the original Verandah Cafe. In June 1923 she was given back to the Shipping Board. Leviathans measured tonnage had increased to 59,956.65 GRT and her speed trials showed an average of 27.48 knots. Thanks in part to Gibbs' clever accounting and the Gulf stream, she was advertised as the world's largest and fastest ship. In the next fiscal year, 30 July 1923 to 30 June 1924, new and more efficient three bladed propellers were designed to replace the original four bladed propellers to be installed at the next dry docking. The design was expected to increase speed at 6,000 less horsepower than the originals.

Service for United States Lines 

United States Lines, the trade name of an operating entity of the USSB's Emergency Fleet Corporation (EFC), was obligated to run Leviathan for a minimum of five return voyages on the Atlantic run per year. All the line's finances were controlled by the USSB which also owned all the ships. The Gibbs Brothers Inc would run her for her first voyages and train the crew. She immediately proved popular with the American public in the '20s, starting her career fully booked for her maiden voyage departing on 4 July 1923.

On 21 December 1923 Leviathan grounded on the west side of the channel at New York near Robbins Reef Light at 10:44 in the morning; remaining grounded until lifted by tide and pulled by tugs at 5:30 in the afternoon. The ship's course was altered by a strong tidal current and though going at a reasonable speed and engines were put full astern the ship grounded from bow to just forward of the bridge. The ship's outboard engines had been reported for some time to be inoperative astern. Though investigation by the United States Steamboat Inspection Service found no negligence they noted that the grounding might have been avoided if the wing propellers had been fully operational astern. It further noted that a ship of that size was very difficult to maneuver in the harbor. One result was to withdraw waters reserved for large naval vessels so that commercial vessels were forced to make a turn in the "Narrows" into the upper bay. The grounding led to a full review of the costs and technical difficulties of repairing the inoperative reverse turbines.

The ship's orchestra, the "SS Leviathan Orchestra", directed by Nelson Maples, was well regarded enough that in 1923 and 1924 Victor Records engaged it to record eleven selections at their New York studios, of which eight were commercially released. Decades later the name would be the inspiration for the New Leviathan Oriental Fox-Trot Orchestra.

Her passenger average reached 1,300 by 1926, making her the second most traveled ship on the Atlantic that year, but given her capacity of 3,000 it was too little to be profitable.
Her economic problems lay primarily in high labor costs and fuel costs which were compounded by Prohibition. From 1920 all US registered ships counted as an extension of US territory, making them "dry ships" according to the National Prohibition Act. With the Atlantic shipping capacity oversaturated, especially after the Immigration Act of 1924, alcohol-seeking passengers readily chose other liners. But Leviathan was an American symbol of power and prestige, which despite her economic failings, made her a popular ship with loyal travelers. She attracted attention as the largest and fastest ship in the American merchant marine and featured in countless advertisements. The only serious incident occurred one day out of Cherbourg on a winter crossing in 1924 where she met a fierce storm with 90 ft waves and winds up to 100 mph, at times forcing her into 20 degree rolls. Eleven portholes were smashed and 32 passengers were injured by the time the storm abated.

Captain Herbert Hartley commanded Leviathan from July 1923 until he retired in February 1928. (Hartley published his autobiography titled Home Is the Sailor in 1955). By 1927 the "good years" were over, in which time the United States Lines had been sold and re-nationalized. In 1929 Leviathan was finally allowed to serve "medicinal alcohol" outside US territorial waters to make her more competitive with foreign lines and was quickly sent on Booze Cruises to make money.

Sale of United States Lines and final days 
In 1929 the United States Lines was advertised to be sold with two ships, Monticello and Mount Vernon, as purchase options which were not included in the final bid that was accepted. Six bids were received and opened on 15 January 1929. On 14 February, after hearings in the Senate Committee on Commerce had raised no objection, the bid of P. W. Chapman Co. of New York was accepted. The sale included another USSB entity, American Merchant Lines, which merged into the commercial United States Lines, Incorporated. The sale was executed on 21 March 1929, with Leviathan being the first ship delivered to the new line on 8 April. A requirement of the sale mandated the new owners, with the construction loan fund, build two first class liners with plans approved by the USSB and U.S. Navy, to operate with Leviathan. Another condition of sale was an obligation to operate the vessels for ten years with a minimum of 61 voyages per year of all the vessels purchased by the new line. Sale of the two lines and eleven vessels for $16,082,000 divested the USSB of the last passenger services. The price of Leviathan was a significant portion of the sale at $6,782,000. The lines had been supervised by the Merchant Fleet Corporation under USSB/EFC with 630 employees and that organization began dissolution.

In October 1931 United States Lines had been reincorporated with the aid of the USSB as United States Lines of Nevada, Inc. after financial difficulties. IMM, which acquired the line at auction, was just as eager to be rid of the white elephant. The Great Depression was the final nail in the coffin. The USSB was abolished and its functions reduced to a Bureau within the Department of Commerce on 10 August 1933. United States Lines actively lobbied for the government to either take the Leviathan back or provide a subsidy for her operation. She was laid up at her pier in Hoboken, New Jersey, in June 1933, having lost $75,000 per round trip since 1929. The government steadfastly stipulated that Leviathan should sail, and so she did after a refurbishment costing $150,000, for another five round trips. The first round trip sailed on 9 June 1934, high season on the Atlantic, and tallied a loss of $143,000. By Leviathans fifth voyage she sailed at barely half capacity. IMM paid the US government $500,000 for permission to retire her while keeping her in running order until 1936.

In 1937 she was sold to the British Metal Industries Ltd. On 26 January 1938 Leviathan set out on her 301st and last transatlantic voyage under the command of Captain John Binks, retired master of the RMS Olympic, with a crew of 125 officers and men who had been hired to deliver the ship to the breakers. To quote author Melvin Maddocks, Binks was not the luckiest of men now he had a ship to match him...it was no easier steering the old monster to her slaughter than it was to steer her any where else. Leviathan arrived at Rosyth, Scotland, on 14 February. In the 13 years that she served United States Lines she carried more than a quarter-million passengers, never making a profit. Due to the size of the vessel and the outbreak of the Second World War, final demolition took place only in 1946.

Footnotes

References

Further reading

External links 
 

Library Of Congress Public Domain Archive Topic: Leviathan
Leviathan at Smithsonian Institution (Links to artifacts held)

1913 ships
Ships built in Hamburg
Passenger ships of Germany
Ocean liners
Imperator-class ocean liners
Ships of the Hamburg America Line
World War I transports of the United States
Unique transports of the United States Navy
Ships of the United States Lines